Lysnes may refer to:
Lysnes, Trom, village in  Troms county, Norway; location of Lysbotn Chapel
 Marie Lysnes (1906-2004), Norwegian nurse